Sweet Spring Creek is a stream in Randolph County in the U.S. state of Missouri. It is a tributary of the East Fork Little Chariton River.

The stream meanders to the west for approximately 12 miles essentially parallel to and about three miles south of US Route 24. It reaches its confluence with the Little Chariton approximately 1.5 miles south-southeast of the community of Clifton Hill.

Sweet Spring Creek was so named on account of its sweet-tasting, clean water.

See also
List of rivers of Missouri

References

Rivers of Randolph County, Missouri
Rivers of Missouri